Count János Zichy de Zich et Vásonkeő (30 May 1868 – 6 January 1944) was a Hungarian politician, who served as Minister of Religion and Education between 1910–1913 and in 1918. He was a member of the House of Magnates from 1894. He was the chairman of the Catholic People's Party for many years, but he resigned in 1903. He joined the Constitution Party in 1906. When the party collapsed, he became a member of the Party of National Work.

During the Hungarian Soviet Republic he participated in the movements against the communists. In 1922 he was elected to the Diet of Hungary. Zichy was a legitimist politician, he founded the legitimist Christian Economic and Social Party (KGSZP). He was a member of the Hungarian Academy of Sciences.

References

 Magyar Életrajzi Lexikon

1868 births
1944 deaths
People from Fejér County
Education ministers of Hungary
Janos, Zichy